Miroslav Ihnačák (born November 19, 1962) is a Slovak former ice hockey player. He played 56 games in the National Hockey League.  He played for the Toronto Maple Leafs and Detroit Red Wings. Since 2020 he is the head coach for HC Merano. Miroslav is the brother of Peter Ihnačák.

Career 
Ihnačák was involved in a true Cold War style spy movie escape from behind the Iron Curtain in late 1985. Just prior to Christmas he and his girlfriend had been smuggled into Vienna, sneaking out of Czechoslovakia in the middle of the night without even bringing any baggage after Maple Leafs owner Harold Ballard spent over $100,000 to get the young superstar smuggled into Austria. There they were awaiting contact from Maple Leaf team officials including General Manager Gerry McNamara who was supposed to be arriving on a commercial flight, but there were reports of terrorists shooting in the airport forcing the plane to divert to another airfield causing the Maple Leaf officials to take a two-hour bus ride to make it back to the Austrian capital. From there further concerns arose including suspicions that the Czechoslovak secret police and even KGB agents were searching for Ihnačák to bring him back home, where he would have been put in prison for three years for the defection attempt. Then problems arose with immigration officials who claimed that Ihnačák would have to spend up to two months in a refugee camp to first apply for asylum in Austria; all of this going on while he and his girlfriend were hiding out in an anonymous Vienna apartment. Then on New Year's Eve reports of the immigration issues were leaked to the press prompting public backlash resulting in two Canadian politicians getting involved to immediately get the Slovak hockey player out on the soonest possible flight. The first available flight was around the other side of the world and on January 4, 1986, Ihnačák and his girlfriend Eva arrived in Vancouver.

Toronto had been off to a very bad start at the beginning of the 1985-86 NHL season and were one of the worst teams in the NHL with a record of 10-20-5. Leafs owner Harold Ballard naturally wanted to improve the fortunes of his team, while at the same time taking advantage of helping a persecuted athlete escape. Following the successful defection Ballard was quoted as saying, “Any communist that I could get out of there who wanted to be a Canadian, I'm very happy about it.”

Even after enduring such a stressful ordeal Ihnačák suited up and played for the Leafs during the second half of the season. He contributed as they attempted to make the playoffs playing in 21 games, scoring two goals and adding four assists. The Maple Leafs would end the season by qualifying for the final playoff spot in the Campbell Conference. While Ihnačák did not play in the postseason the Leafs upset the Norris Division champion Chicago Black Hawks and then gave the upstart St. Louis Blues everything they could handle before finally falling to them in seven games.

After retiring from hockey, Ihnaček became a coach. He has had head coaching stints at MHK Kezmarok, GKS Tychy, HK Spisska Nova Ves, HK Michalovce, HC Košice, TMH Polonia Bytom and Dunaújvárosi Acélbikák. He currently works as a head coach for HC Merano.

Career statistics

Regular season and playoffs

International

References

External links

1962 births
Living people
Adirondack Red Wings players
Adler Mannheim players
BSC Preussen Berlin players
Detroit Red Wings players
Czechoslovak ice hockey left wingers
ERC Selb players
EV Zug players
HK Poprad players
Halifax Citadels players
HC Košice players
MHC Martin players
Milwaukee Admirals (IHL) players
Newmarket Saints players
Sportspeople from Poprad
Slovak ice hockey left wingers
St. Catharines Saints players
Toronto Maple Leafs draft picks
Toronto Maple Leafs players
Czechoslovak defectors
Czechoslovak expatriate sportspeople in the United States
Czechoslovak expatriate sportspeople in Canada
Czechoslovak expatriate sportspeople in Germany
Slovak expatriate ice hockey players in Germany
Slovak expatriate ice hockey players in Switzerland
Expatriate ice hockey players in Canada
Slovak expatriate ice hockey players in the United States
Slovak ice hockey coaches
Slovak expatriate sportspeople in Hungary
Slovak expatriate sportspeople in Poland
Slovak expatriate sportspeople in Italy